The Journal of Molluscan Studies is the peer-reviewed scientific journal of the Malacological Society of London, covering research in malacology.

Previous names of this journal include Proceedings of the Malacological Society, and Proceedings of the Malacological Society of London (abbreviated as Proc. Malacol. Soc. Lond.).

Abstracting and indexing 
The journal is abstracted and indexed by Aquatic Sciences and Fisheries Abstracts, Biological Abstracts, BIOSIS Previews, CAB Abstracts, Current Contents/Agriculture, Biology, and Environmental Sciences, BIOBASE, ProQuest, Science Citation Index Expanded, Scopus, and The Zoological Record.

According to the Journal Citation Reports, the journal has a 2020 impact factor was 1.348.

See also
Archiv für Molluskenkunde
Basteria
Journal of Conchology
Malacologia
The Nautilus

References

External links 

 

Malacology journals
Publications established in 1893
English-language journals
Oxford University Press academic journals
Quarterly journals